Betty Miller may refer to:

 Betty Miller (author) (1910–1965), Jewish author
 Betty Miller (pilot) (1926–2018), first female pilot to fly solo across the Pacific Ocean, 1963
 Betty G. Miller (1934–2012), American artist

See also
 Elizabeth Miller (disambiguation)